Atlantic Gateway can refer to three different infrastructure projects:

Atlantic Gateway (Canada)
Atlantic Gateway (North West England)
Atlantic Gateway (Virginia)